The Imperial Service Order was established by King Edward VII in August 1902. It was awarded on retirement to the administration and clerical staff of the Civil Service throughout the British Empire for long and meritorious service. Normally a person must have served for 25 years to become eligible, but this might be shortened to 16 years for those serving in unhealthy climates abroad. There is one class: Companion. Both men and women are eligible, and recipients of this order are entitled to use the post-nominal letters 'ISO'.

History
The new order was announced in the 1902 Coronation Honours list published on 26 June 1902, on the day scheduled for the Coronation of King Edward VII and Queen Alexandra. The coronation was postponed due to the King's illness, however, and the statutes of the order were published on 8 August 1902, to coincide with the actual coronation on the following day. The first list of recipients was included in the Birthday Honours list published on the King′s birthday 9 November 1902.

Insignia

The insignia of the order for men was an eight-pointed silver star, with the top ray obscured by a crown; the golden central medallion bore the cipher of the reigning monarch surrounded by the legend 'For Faithful Service'. This was suspended on a ribbon of crimson with a blue central stripe.

The insignia of the order for women had the same medallion as for men, surrounded by a silver laurel wreath and topped by a crown. This was suspended on a bow of crimson with a blue central stripe.

Imperial Service Medal

Civil  servants who complete 25 years' service are eligible for the Imperial Service Medal (ISM) upon retirement. The medal is a silver circular medal bearing the effigy of the reigning monarch on the obverse, and the motif of a man resting after work with the legend 'For Faithful Service' on the reverse. The ribbon or bow pattern is the same as the Imperial Service Order.

1993 reforms

During the 1993 reform of the British honours system the British Government decided to make no new appointments to the Imperial Service Order; the Imperial Service Medal, however, continues to be awarded in recognition of certain individuals who make positive contributions.

See also
 Orders and decorations of the Commonwealth realms

References

Civil awards and decorations of the United Kingdom

Awards established in 1902
1902 establishments in the British Empire
Orders, decorations, and medals of the British Empire
Long service medals